Tapinoma carininotum is a species of ant in the genus Tapinoma. Described by Weber in 1943, the species is endemic to Sudan.

References

Tapinoma
Hymenoptera of Africa
Insects described in 1943